Iron Mountain is a mountain located in the Willamette National Forest of Oregon. The mountain is best known for its hike that leads to the top. The top provides views of nearby mountains such as Mt. Jefferson. The top also has a platform for hikers to relax and take in the view.

References

Mountains of Oregon